The 1992 Don't Drink Drive Sandown 500 was an endurance motor race open to Group 3A Touring Cars (commonly known as Group A cars), 1993 Group 3A 5.0 Litre Touring Cars (later to become known as V8 Supercars) and Group 3E Series Production Cars. It was held at the Sandown International Motor Raceway, in Victoria, Australia, on 13 September 1992, over 136 laps of the 3.1 km circuit, a total distance of approximately 422 km. The race, which was the 27th Sandown 500, was won by Larry Perkins and Steve Harrington driving a Holden VL Commodore.

The race was intended to be run over 150 laps, but it was significantly delayed by several periods of slow running behind the pace car. With the Sandown circuit operating under an Environmental Protection Agency curfew of 5pm, the race was shortened to 136 laps.

Top 10 Qualifiers

Although no official Top 10 run off was held during qualifying for the Sandown 500, the top 10 qualifiers were:

Results

Statistics
 Pole Position - 1:15.87 - #17 Dick Johnson - Ford Sierra RS500
 Fastest Lap - 1:16.88 - #17 Dick Johnson/John Bowe - Ford Sierra RS500

See also
1992 Australian Touring Car season

References

External links
 Image of program cover, www.progcovers.com, as archived at web.archive.org
 Image of the winning car, cdn1.bigcommerce.com, as archived at web.archive.org

Motorsport at Sandown
Don't Drink Drive Sandown 500
Pre-Bathurst 500